This is the Estonian County Competition.

Competition
Estonian Football Association together with the provincial sport associations and local promoters arrange the Estonian County Competition, where 15 counties and the capital Tallinn have their football teams face each other. All teams will play each other twice (home and away). If a game is drawn, a winner will be founded with penalties, but a draw is put into the protocol and both teams get one point added to the table. Every year every team plays one game. The competition was started in 2012.

Stadiums

Fixtures and results

References
 Estonian Football Association 

Football in Estonia